Jossa is a river of Hesse, Germany. It is a tributary of the Sinn, which in turn flows into the Franconian Saale shortly before the latter discharges into the Main at Gemünden am Main.

Course

The Jossa has a length of 32.3 kilometres.

Here the Villbach is joined by the Lettgenbrunner Quelle. Since 2007, the place has been marked by a large boulder.

The Jossa then flows southeast before turning northwards. Its northernmost point is near  (part of Steinau an der Strasse) and it then flows southeast to discharge into the Sinn at Jossa, a part of Sinntal.

Watershed
The Jossa and its tributaries drain an area of around 146.7 square kilometres. It marks the border of the area that drains to the east towards the Sinn. To the west and north lies the Kinzig watershed.

Natural history
Beavers have been successfully reintroduced since 1987/88 in the Jossa and Sinn valleys. From an original population of 18 beavers (from the Elbe river), their numbers have recently grown to more than 200.

See also
List of rivers of Hesse

References

Rivers of Hesse
Rivers of the Spessart
Rivers of Germany